The 2021–22 Israel State Cup (Gvia HaMedina) is the 83rd season of Israel's nationwide Association football cup competition and the 67th after the Israeli Declaration of Independence. The competition stated in August 2021.

Preliminary rounds

Liga Bet
Schedule:
 Schedule:
 Results:

Liga Bet North A

Liga Bet North B

Liga Bet South A

Liga Bet South B

Liga Gimel
Sources:
 Schedule:
 Results:

Liga Gimel Upper Galilee

Liga Gimel Lower Galilee

Liga Gimel Jezreel

Liga Gimel Samaria

Liga Gimel Sharon

Liga Gimel Central

Liga Gimel Tel Aviv

Liga Gimel South

Liga Alef stage

Liga Alef — Fifth round

Liga Alef — Sixth round

Sixth round
Source:

Seventh round
Source:

Eighth round
Source:

Round of 16
Source:

Quarter-finals
Unlike the other competitions stages, the quarterfinals will be held in a two-legged format. The draw was held on 13 January 2022 at 14:00 local time.

|}

Semi-finals
The draw was held on 6 March 2022 at 15:00 local time.

Final

The final was played on 24 May 2022 at the Teddy Stadium in Jerusalem. Hapoel Be'er Sheva won after beating Maccabi Haifa 3–1 in penalties, after 2–2 in extra time.

References

State Cup
Israel State Cup seasons
Israel